Mia Mia may refer to:

Mia-mia, a temporary shelter used by Indigenous Australians
Mia Mia, Queensland, Australia
Mia Mia, Victoria, a town in Australia

See also
Mieh Mieh, Lebanon